Novoazovsk is a border town on the south-eastern tip of Ukraine (near the border with Russia), in Kalmiuske Raion (district), in Donetsk Oblast (province). Population: ; 12,702 (2001). 

 1849–1923 Novonikolayevka
 1923–1959 Budyonivka
 1959–present Novoazovsk

Novoazovsk and adjacent areas are the only places in Ukraine where the great black-headed gull (Larus ichthyaetus) lives.

History

Beginning in mid-April 2014 pro-Russian separatists captured several towns in Donetsk Oblast; including Novoazovsk. In June 2014 Ukrainian forces reportedly secured the city from the separatists. The situation around the town then became relatively quiet. On 25 August 2014, Ukraine claimed that Russian soldiers disguised as separatists had opened a new front in the War in Donbass with an offensive against Mariupol. Ukraine claimed it had blocked this offensive near Novoazovsk. Fighting in the area continued on 26 August 2014. According to a Ukrainian Dnipro Battalion commander, Novoazovsk was overrun by Russian tanks and fell to the Russians on 27 August. This claim was confirmed by Ukrainian authorities the next day. On the other hand, separatist leaders on the same day claimed that the town was taken by separatist forces as part of an offensive against Mariupol.

Gallery

Climate
The climate in Novoazovsk is a hot/warm summer subtype (Köppen: Dfa) of the humid continental climate.

References

External links

м Новоазовськ, Донецька область, Новоазовський район (rada.gov.ua)

Cities in Donetsk Oblast
Don Host Oblast
Cities of district significance in Ukraine
Populated places established in the Russian Empire
Kalmiuske Raion